The 1937 Tschammerpokal Final decided the winner of the 1937 Tschammerpokal, the 3rd season of Germany's knockout football cup competition. It was played on 9 January 1938 at the Müngersdorfer Stadion in Cologne. Schalke 04 won the match 2–1 against Fortuna Düsseldorf, to claim their 1st cup title.

With their win, Schalke completed the first double in the history of German football, having previously won the 1937 German football championship with a 2–0 win over 1. FC Nürnberg in the final.

Route to the final
The Tschammerpokal began the final stage with 61 teams in a single-elimination knockout cup competition. There were a total of five rounds leading up to the final. Teams were drawn against each other, and the winner after 90 minutes would advance. If still tied, 30 minutes of extra time was played. If the score was still level, a replay would take place at the original away team's stadium. If still level after 90 minutes, 30 minutes of extra time was played. If the score was still level, a second replay would take place at the original home team's stadium. If still level after 90 minutes, 30 minutes of extra time was played. If the score was still level, a drawing of lots would decide who would advance to the next round.

Note: In all results below, the score of the finalist is given first (H: home; A: away).

Match

Details

References

External links
 Match report at kicker.de 
 Match report at WorldFootball.net
 Match report at Fussballdaten.de 

FC Schalke 04 matches
Fortuna Düsseldorf matches
Tschammerpokal Final
1937
Sports competitions in Cologne
20th century in Cologne
January 1938 sports events